Susan La Flesche Picotte (June 17, 1865 – September 18, 1915, Omaha) was a Native American doctor and reformer in the late 19th century. She is widely acknowledged as one of the first Indigenous peoples, and the first Indigenous woman, to earn a medical degree. She campaigned for public health and for the formal, legal allotment of land to members of the Omaha tribe.

Picotte was an active social reformer as well as a physician. She worked to discourage drinking on the reservation where she worked as the physician, as part of the temperance movement of the 19th century. Picotte also campaigned to prevent and treat tuberculosis, which then had no cure, as part of a public health campaign. She also worked to help other Omaha navigate the bureaucracy of the Office of Indian Affairs and receive the money owed to them for the sale of their land.

Early life
Susan La Flesche was born in June 1865 on the Omaha Reservation in eastern Nebraska. Her parents were culturally Omaha with European and Indigenous ancestry and had lived for periods of time beyond the borders of the reservation. They married sometime in 1845–1846.

Susan’s father, Joseph La Flesche also called Iron Eye, was of Ponca and some French Canadian ancestry. He was educated in St. Louis, Missouri, but returned to the reservation as a young man. He identified culturally as Omaha. In 1853 he was adopted by Chief Big Elk, who chose him as his successor, and La Flesche became the principal leader of the Omaha tribe around 1855. Iron Eye sought to help his people by encouraging a  certain amount of assimilation, particularly through the policy of land allotment, which caused some friction among the Omaha.

Susan’s mother, Mary Gale, was the daughter of Dr. John Gale, a white United States Army surgeon stationed at Fort Atkinson, and Nicomi, a woman of  Omaha/Otoe/Iowa heritage. Gale was also the stepdaughter of prominent Nebraska fur trader and statesman Peter A. Sarpy. Like her husband, Mary Gale was identified as Omaha. Although she understood French and English, she refused to speak any language other than Omaha.

Susan was the youngest of four girls, including her sisters Susette (1854–1903), Rosalie (1861–1900), and Marguerite (1862–1945). Her older half-brother Francis La Flesche, born in 1857 to her father's second wife, later became renowned as an ethnologist, anthropologist and musicologist (or ethnomusicologist), who focused on the Omaha and Osage cultures.  As she grew, La Flesche learned the traditions of her heritage, but her parents felt certain  rituals would be detrimental in the white world. They did not give their youngest daughter an Omaha name and prevented her from receiving traditional tattoos across her forehead. She spoke Omaha with her parents (especially with her mother), but her father and oldest sister Susette encouraged her to speak English with her sisters, so that she would be fluent in both languages.

As a child, LaFlesche witnessed a sick Indian woman die after a white doctor refused to treat her. She later credited this tragedy as her inspiration to train as a physician, so she could provide care for the people she lived with on the Omaha Reservation.

Education

Early education
La Flesche's education began early, at the mission school on the reservation. It was run first by the Presbyterians and then by the Quakers, after the enactment of President Ulysses S. Grant's "Peace Policy" in 1869. The reservation school was a boarding school where Native children were taught the practices of European Americans to assimilate them into white society.

After several years at the mission school, La Flesche left the reservation for Elizabeth, New Jersey, where she studied at the Elizabeth Institute for two and a half years. She returned to the reservation in 1882 and taught at the agency school. She left again to study at the Hampton Institute in Hampton, Virginia, from 1884 to 1886. It had been established as an historically black college after the American Civil War, but had become a destination also for Native American students.

La Flesche attended Hampton with her sister Marguerite, her stepbrother Cary, and ten other Omaha children. The girls learned housewifery skills and the boys learned vocational skills as part of the practical skills promoted at the school. While La Flesche was a student at the Hampton Institute, she became romantically involved with a young Sioux man named Thomas Ikinicapi. She referred to him affectionately as "T.I.", but broke off her relationship with him before graduating from Hampton. La Flesche graduated from Hampton on May 20, 1886, where she was class salutatorian. She was also awarded the Demorest prize, which is given to the graduating senior who receives the highest examination scores during the junior year.

Female graduates of the Hampton Institute were generally encouraged to teach or to return to their reservations and become Christian wives and mothers. La Flesche decided in 1886 to apply to medical school.

Medical school

Though women were often healers in Omaha Indian society, it was uncommon for any Victorian-era woman in the United States to go to medical school. In the late 19th century, only a few medical schools accepted women.

La Flesche was accepted at the Woman's Medical College of Pennsylvania (WMCP), which had been established in 1850 as one of the few medical schools on the East Coast for the education of women. Medical school was expensive, however, and she could not afford it on her own. For help, she turned to family friend Alice Fletcher, an ethnographer from Massachusetts who had a broad network of contacts within women's reform organizations. La Flesche had previously helped nurse Fletcher back to health following a flareup of inflammatory rheumatism.

Fletcher encouraged La Flesche to appeal to the Connecticut Indian Association, a local auxiliary of the Women's National Indian Association (WNIA). The WNIA sought to "civilize" the Indians by encouraging Victorian values of domesticity among Indian women, and sponsored field matrons whose task was to teach Native American women "cleanliness" and "godliness."

La Flesche, in writing to the Connecticut Indian Association, had described her desire to enter the homes of her people as a physician and teach them hygiene as well as curing their ills; this was in line with the Victorian virtues of domesticity which the Association wanted to encourage. The Association sponsored La Flesche's medical school expenses, and also paid for her housing, books and other supplies. She is considered the first person to receive aid for professional education in the United States. The Association requested that she remain single during her time at medical school and for several years after her graduation, in order to focus on her practice.

At the WMCP, La Flesche studied chemistry, anatomy, physiology, histology, pharmaceutical science, obstetrics, and general medicine, and, like her peers, did clinical work at facilities in Philadelphia alongside students from other colleges, both male and female. While attending medical school, La Flesche changed her appearance. She began to dress like her white classmates and wore her hair in a bun on the top of her head as they did.

After La Flesche's second year in medical school, she had to return home to help her family, many of whom had fallen ill due to a measles outbreak. It could be a serious disease for both adults and children. During the rest of her schooling, she would write letters back home giving medical advice.

She was valedictorian and graduated at the top of her class on March 14, 1889, after a rigorous three-year course of study.

In June 1889, La Flesche applied for the position of government physician at the Omaha Agency Indian School; she was offered the position less than two months later. After her graduation, she went on a speaking tour at the request of the Connecticut Indian Association, assuring white audiences that Indians could benefit from white civilization.

She maintained her ties with the Association after medical school. They appointed her as a medical missionary to the Omaha after graduation, and the Association funded purchase of medical instruments and books for her during her early years of practicing medicine in Nebraska.

Medical practice

La Flesche returned to the Omaha reservation in 1889 to take up her position as the physician at the government boarding school on the reservation, run by the Office of Indian Affairs. There she was responsible for teaching the students about hygiene and keeping them healthy.

Though she was not obligated to care for the broader community, the school was closer to many people than the official reservation agency, and La Flesche found herself caring for many members of the community as well as for the children of the school. La Flesche often had 20-hour workdays and was responsible for over 1,200 people.
From her office in a corner of the schoolyard, with the supplies provided by the Connecticut Indian Association, she helped people with their health but also with more mundane tasks, such as writing letters and translating official documents.

She was widely trusted in the community, making house calls and caring for patients sick with tuberculosis, influenza, cholera, dysentery, and trachoma.
Her first office, which was a mere 12 by 16 feet, doubled as a community meeting place.

For several years, she traveled the reservation caring for patients, on a government salary of $500.00 per year, in addition to the $250 from the Women's National Indian Association for her work as a medical missionary.

In December 1892, she became very sick, and was bedridden for several weeks. She was forced to take time off in 1893 to care for her ailing mother and also to restore her own health. She resigned in 1893 to take care of her dying mother, putting familial obligations before her public work.

In 1894, La Flesche met and became engaged to Henry Picotte, a Sioux Indian from the Yankton agency. He had been married before and divorced his wife. Many of La Flesche's friends and family were surprised at the romance, but the two were married in June 1894.

Picotte and her husband had two sons: Caryl, born in 1895 or 1896, and Pierre, born in early 1898. Picotte continued to practice medicine after the birth of her children, depending on the support of her husband to make that possible. This was unusual for Victorian-era women, who were generally expected to stay home after marriage in order to be full-time mothers. Picotte's practice treated both Omaha and white patients in the town of Bancroft and surrounding communities. If necessary, Picotte would even take her children on house calls with her sometimes.

Public health reforms

Temperance
In addition to caring for her people's immediate medical problems, Picotte sought to educate her community about preventive medicine and other public health issues, including temperance. Alcoholism was a serious problem on the Omaha reservation, and a personal one for Picotte: her husband Henry was an alcoholic. Disreputable whites used alcohol to take advantage of Omahas while making land deals. Picotte, as reservation physician and a prominent member of the community, was well aware of the damage such practices caused. La Flesche supported measures such as coercion and punishment to dissuade individuals from alcohol consumption within the Omaha community. Under her father's rule, a secret police system was instilled which supported corporal punishment to discipline those who consumed alcohol.

Picotte campaigned against alcohol, giving lectures about the virtues of temperance, and embracing coercive efforts as well, such as prohibition. In the early 1890s, she campaigned for a prohibition law in Thurston County, which did not pass, in part because of unscrupulous liquor dealers who took advantage of illiterate Omahas by handing them ballot tickets with "Against Prohibition" on them. Other sources claim that the Indian men were bribed with liquor from white men. Later, she lobbied for the Meilklejohn Bill, which would outlaw the sale of alcohol to any recipient of allotted land whose property was still held in trust by the government. The Meiklejohn Bill became law in January 1897 but proved nearly impossible to enforce.

Picotte continued to fight against alcohol for the rest of her life, and when the peyote religion arrived on the Omaha reservation in the early 1900s, she gradually accepted it as a means of fighting alcoholism, as many members of the peyote religion were able to reconnect with their spiritual traditions and reject alcoholic ambitions.

Sanitation, tuberculosis, and other public health reforms

Beyond temperance, Picotte worked on public health issues in the wider community, including school hygiene, food sanitation, and efforts to combat the spread of tuberculosis. She served on the health board of the town of Walthill, and was a founding member of the Thurston County Medical Society in 1907.

Picotte was also the chair of the state health committee of the Nebraska Federation of Women's Clubs during the first decade of the 20th century. As chair, she spearheaded efforts to educate people about public health issues, particularly in the schools, believing that the key to fighting disease was education. From her time in medical school onward, she also campaigned for the building of a hospital on the reservation. It was finally completed in 1913 and later named in her honor. This was the first privately funded hospital on a reservation.

Her most important crusade was against tuberculosis, which killed hundreds of Omaha, including her husband Henry in 1905. In 1907, she wrote to the Indian Office to try to persuade them to help, but they turned her down, blaming a lack of funding.  Because there was not yet a cure available, Picotte advocated cleanliness, fresh air, and the eradication of houseflies, which were believed to be major carriers of TB.

Picotte's willingness to engage in political action carried over into areas other than public health. After the death of her husband, she became increasingly active in the campaigns against extenting the trust period for the Omaha. She was a delegate to the Secretary of the Interior, protesting changes in the supervision of the Omaha.

Political involvement and the issue of allotment

Struggles with inheritance

The issue of land allotment came up again when Picotte's husband Henry died in 1905. He left about 185 acres of land in South Dakota to her and their two sons, Pierre and Caryl, but complications had arisen in claiming and selling it. At the time of Henry's death, the land was still held in trust by the government, and in order to receive the monies from its sale, his heirs had to prove competency. Minors, such as Picotte's sons, had to have a legal guardian who could prove competency on their behalf.

The process of gaining the monies owed to them was long and arduous, and Picotte had to send letter after letter to the Indian Office to get them to recognize her as a competent individual in order to receive her portion of the inheritance, which R. J. Taylor, the agent on the Yankton reservation, finally granted to her in 1907, nearly two years after her husband's death. However, gaining her children's inheritance proved to be a harder struggle. Another relative, Peter Picotte, was the legal guardian of her sons' land, because it was in another state, but he refused to consent to the sale of the land.

Picotte responded by bombarding Commissioner Leupp, head of the Indian Office, with letters, painting Peter Picotte as a drunk and R. J. Taylor as intransigent and incompetent, while making a case for herself as the best manager of her sons' money. This time, her letters received attention, and the Indian Office responded to her within a week of the original letters, informing her that Taylor had been ordered to ignore Peter Picotte's objections.

Picotte invested this money in rental properties, and was able to use that income to support herself and her sons. This was not the end of her fights with the bureaucracy of the federal government, however. Her children inherited land from some Sioux relatives of her husband, and she entered into another battle with the bureaucracy, which ended positively in 1908.

Action for the community
Picotte's struggles with the bureaucracy of allotment continued on behalf of other members of her community. In her position as a doctor, Picotte had gained the trust of her community, and her role as a local leader had expanded from letter writer/interpreter to defender of Omaha land interests. She sought to help other Omaha who wanted to sell their lands and gain control of the monies owed to them, and she also tried to help resolve situations where whites took advantage of Indians who chose to lease land.

Doing this work, she became increasingly aware and outraged at the land fraud committed by a syndicate of men on and around the Omaha reservation. Picotte focused on the syndicate, which was made up of three white and two Omaha men who defrauded minors of their inheritances. In a bizarre twist, Picotte, who had spent much of her life proclaiming that the Omaha had the same capacity for "civilization" as any white man, wrote to the Indian Office in 1909 to say that some of her people were too incompetent to protect themselves against the fraudsters and thus needed the continued guardianship of the federal government. In 1910, she traveled to Washington, D.C. to speak with officials from the Office of Indian Affairs (OIA), and told them that though most of the Omaha were perfectly competent to manage their own affairs, the Indian Office had stifled the development of business skills and knowledge of the white world among Indians, and thus the incompetence of a minority of Omaha was, in fact, the fault of the federal government.

This argument was the product of her campaigns against the consolidation of the Omaha and Winnebago agencies, which had been suggested in 1904 and revived in 1910. Picotte had been part of a movement among the Omaha opposing this consolidation, and used letters and harshly critical newspaper articles to get her point across to the OIA bureaucracy. She argued that the unnecessary red tape created by the consolidation was nothing but an extra burden on the Omaha and was further proof that the OIA treated them like children, rather than as citizens ready to participate in a democracy. She continued to work on her community's behalf until the end of her life, though much of that seemed to be in vain, as her people lost many of their ancestral lands and became more, not less, dependent on the OIA.

Illness, death, and legacy

Picotte suffered for most of her life from chronic illness. In medical school, she had been bothered by trouble breathing, and after a few years working on the reservation, she was forced to take a break to recover her health in 1892, as she suffered from chronic pain in her neck, head, and ears. She recovered but became ill again in 1893, after a fall from her horse left her with significant internal injuries. Over time, Picotte's condition caused her to go deaf.

As Picotte aged, her health declined, and by the time that the new reservation hospital was built in Walthill in 1913, she was too frail to be its sole administrator. By early March 1915, she was suffering greatly and died of bone cancer on September 18, 1915. The next day, services by both the Presbyterian Church as well as the Amethyst Chapter of the Order of the Eastern Star were performed. She is buried in Bancroft Cemetery, Bancroft, Nebraska near her husband, father, mother, sisters and half-brother.

Picotte's sons went on to live full lives. Caryl Picotte made a career in the United States Army and served in World War II, eventually settling in El Cajon, California. Pierre Picotte lived in Walthill, Nebraska, for most of his life and raised a family of three children.

In her career, Picotte served over 1,300 patients in a 450 square mile area.

Tributes

The reservation hospital in Walthill, Nebraska, now a community center, is named after Picotte and was declared a National Historic Landmark in 1993. The hospital has also been named as one of the 11 most endangered places of 2018 by the National Trust. Work is underway to raise funds for its restoration.

An elementary school in western Omaha Nebraska is named after Picotte.

On June 17, 2017, the 152nd anniversary of her birth, Google released a Google Doodle honoring Picotte.

In 2018, a bust of Picotte was dedicated at the Martin Luther King Jr. Transportation Center in Sioux City.

In 2019, a statue of La Flesche was dedicated as part of Hampton University's Legacy Park.

On October 11, 2021, Nebraska's first officially recognized Indigenous Peoples’ Day, a bronze sculpture of Dr. Susan La Flesche Picotte was unveiled by her descendants on Lincoln’s Centennial Mall. Benjamin Victor (sculptor) created the Picotte bronze. He is the same artist who created the Chief Standing Bear sculpture that now sits on Centennial Mall, and another version of it stands in Statuary Hall in Washington D.C.

Citations

Bibliography

Further reading

External links 
 

1865 births
1915 deaths
19th-century American physicians
20th-century American physicians
19th-century American women physicians
20th-century American women physicians
19th-century Native Americans
20th-century Native Americans
Drexel University alumni
Hampton University alumni
La Flesche family
Native American physicians
Omaha (Native American) people
People from Thurston County, Nebraska
Physicians from Nebraska
Woman's Medical College of Pennsylvania alumni
19th-century Native American women
20th-century Native American women